Majdan Sopocki Pierwszy is a village in the administrative district of Gmina Susiec, within Tomaszów Lubelski County, Lublin Voivodeship, in eastern Poland.

The village has a population of 510.

References

Majdan Sopocki Pierwszy